Earth Observing 3 (EO3) was a proposed joint mission between NASA New Millennium Program and the US Navy's Office of Naval Research. Geosynchronous Imaging Fourier Transform Spectrometer — Indian Ocean METOC Imager (GIFTS-IOMI) was the instrument selected by NASA to perform as EO3's latest weather satellite observing instrument. The EO3 project ended with the cancellation of NMP in 2008.

References

External links
 Earth Observing-3 at the NASA 

Cancelled spacecraft
New Millennium Program
Earth observation satellites of the United States